1. FC Nürnberg is a German football club based in Nuremberg, Bavaria. The following list contains all the footballers that have made over 100 league appearances for the club since 1945.

Players
Statistics correct as of the end of the 2021–22 season

References
Internetlexikon der Clubspieler 
weltfussball.de 
Fussballdaten – Die Fußball-Datenbank 

Players
 
Nuremberg
Association football player non-biographical articles